Kardoust is an Arabic surname. Notable people with the surname include:

Asghar Kardoust (born 1986), Iranian basketball player
Reza Kardoust (born 1984), Iranian football player

Arabic-language surnames